Poltár is a town and municipality in the Poltár District in the Banská Bystrica Region of Slovakia.

Geography
It is home to a small production bespoke crystal maker called Slovglass Poltar that currently supplies Debenhams plc department stores in the UK and Ireland.

History
There were historical Slavic remains of ancient housing, probably from the 7th century.
After that remains of small medieval castle are part  of Poltár's history, found in the general area and in the town part of Kostolisko (Literally meaning "Place of Church") there are remains of romancatholic church.
Poltár was first mentioned in 1246 as silva Polta. Some other names are Nagpolthar, Felsupolthar, Kyspoltar, Varalyapolthar  (1409) and Polthar (1439).
In the 16th century the town was divided into Horný Poltár  and Dolný Poltár. In the same general time, it was occupied by the Ottomans (between 1554 and 1593).
In the year 1828 there were only mere 83 houses and 56 citizens. In the same timeframe, the town of Poltár was very agricultural, which sadly wasn't profitable for the town. 
From 1869 and onwards, the factory of Barratt-Dragon was built, with its primary focus being the creation of bricks and tiles.
From 1922, a steam sawmill was built, sadly burning down fourteen years later in 1936.
The citizens of Poltár were also very active in the Slovak National Uprising.
In the year 1966 Poltár joins the towns of Slaná lehota and Zelené, receiving the city privileges.

Parts of Poltár
Podháj - built during the late medieval era by the Sóós family. It was destroyed during the ottoman occupation during 1554-1562. It was rebuilt around the 17th century, but only as a small village.

Prievrana - built during the late medieval era. It was destroyed during the multiple military actions in the area roughly around 1610. It was rebuilt in the 17th century, only as a small village.
Its other names (mainly Hungarian) were Prenna and Perenna.

Slaná Lehota - built in the second half of 14th century. The town was owned by Fiľakovo. Between the years 1554-1593 it was occupied by the Ottomans. After that, in 1598 the Sóós family became the owners. In 17th and 18th century Geczy family became the owners.
In the year 1828 it had 23 houses and 130 citizens.      

Zelené - Founded approximately in the 14th century. It was owned by many families during its history. It was occupied by the Ottomans in 1554-1593. In the year 1828 it had 28 houses and 274 citizens. The town helped the Slovak National Uprising movement.

Demographics
According to the 2001 census, the town had 6,099 inhabitants. 97.49% of inhabitants were Slovaks, 0.95% Roma, 0.51% Hungarians and 0.41% Czechs. The religious make-up was 50.14% Roman Catholics, 22.89% people with no religious affiliation and 20.79% Lutherans.

People
 Ivan Gašparovič, the former President of Slovakia was born here.

References

External links
 
 
Municipal website 

Cities and towns in Slovakia
Villages and municipalities in Poltár District